Saranga is a Tanzanian administrative ward located in Ubungo District, Dar es Salaam Region of Tanzania. According to the 2012 census, the ward has a total population of 104,127.

References

Dar es Salaam Region

External links 
 http://www.ubungomc.go.tz/council-list